An AR-22 rifle is the general name given to an AR-15 rifle that can shoot 22lr rounds instead of 5.56 NATO rounds. An example of such a weapon available commercially would be the Smith & Wesson M&P15-22. A popular option is a conversion kit and alternate magazines for existing AR-15 rifles. In this vain, some manufacturers sell converted upper receivers as "AR-22" or similar.

Purpose 

A reason to convert a rifle to 22lr is the price per round of ammunition, as 22lr are often among the cheapest ammunition available.

References

Rifles of the United States